The Cause may refer to:
 The American Revolution
 A euphemism for Irish republicanism
 A euphemism for Confederate secession during the American Civil War
 A euphemism for Loyalism in Ireland
 A euphemism for Anarchy
A euphemism for the Palestinian Resistance
 A song from the album Punk In Drublic by the American Punk rock band NOFX

Euphemisms